Jeff Moores ( – 17 Jul 1989) was an Australian professional rugby league footballer who played in the 1920s and 1930s.

Playing career

International honours
Jeff Moores played right-, i.e. number 3, in Rugby League XIII's 25-18 victory over France at Headingley Rugby Stadium, Leeds on Wednesday 6 March 1935.

Challenge Cup Final appearances
Jeff Moores played right-, i.e. number 3, in Leeds' 11–8 victory over Swinton in the 1931–32 Challenge Cup Final during the 1931–32 season at Central Park, Wigan, on Saturday 7 May 1932, in front of a crowd of 29,000.

County Cup Final appearances
Jeff Moores played, and scored 2-tries in Leeds' 8–0 victory over Wakefield Trinity in the 1932–33 Yorkshire County Cup Final during the 1932–33 season at Fartown Ground, Huddersfield on Saturday 19 November 1932, played in York's 10–4 victory over Hull Kingston Rovers in the 1933–34 Yorkshire County Cup Final during the 1933–34 season at Headingley Rugby Stadium, Leeds on Saturday 25 November 1933, and played in 0–3 defeat by Leeds in the 1935–36 Yorkshire County Cup Final during the 1935–36 season at Thrum Hall, Halifax on Saturday 19 October 1935.

References

External links
Moores Accepts Leeds
Moores' Wizardy Thrills League Crowd
Photograph of Jeff Moores
Jeff Moores Suspended

1900s births
1989 deaths
Australian rugby league players
Australian expatriate sportspeople in England
Dominion XIII rugby league team players
Leeds Rhinos captains
Leeds Rhinos players
Queensland rugby league team players
Rugby league centres
Rugby league five-eighths
Rugby League XIII players
Wests Panthers players
York Wasps players
Rugby league players from Brisbane